A technical director (TD) is usually a senior technical person within e.g. a software company, engineering firm, film studio, theatre company or television studio.  This person usually has the highest level of skill within a specific technical field.

It is also a common alternative title in association football for the position of Sporting director.

Software 
In software development, a technical director is typically responsible for the successful creation and delivery of the company's product to the marketplace by managing technical risks and opportunities; making key software design and implementation decisions with the development teams, scheduling of tasks including tracking dependencies, managing change requests, and guaranteeing quality of deliveries and educating the team on technical best practices.

Typical responsibilities:
 Defines the technological strategy in conjunction with the development team of each project: pipeline, tools, and key development procedures
 Assesses technical risk and mitigation plan
 Establishes standards and procedures to track and measure project's progression
 Evaluates development teams, identifying strengths, problem areas, and developing plans for improving performance
 Evaluates interview candidates for technical positions
 Scouts for and evaluates new technology and tools as opportunities for innovation and development excellence
 Oversees technical design documentation process for correctness and timeliness
 Provides input to the other disciplines on the practicality of initial design goals and impact to the overall project timeline
 Evaluates software implementation on design and task thoroughness
 Helps to identify high risk areas for the project director
 Identifies weak software systems that need code improvement and schedules corrective action, when possible
 Creates automated test process for system features, where possible, and contributes to the build system
 Aids in all stages of post-production including during finalizing

Film 
In visual effects (VFX) (Industrial Light and Magic, Sony Pictures Imageworks), feature animation (Pixar, Dreamworks Animation) and game development (Naughty Dog), a technical director's responsibilities vary from studio to studio and as such, the term is not very well defined.

Typically, a TD is a combination of an artist and a programmer, responsible for the more technical aspects of film production, such as programming shaders, developing character rigs and animation setups, performing complex simulation tasks and setting up the pipeline (how the data is passed from one stage in the film production to the next). In contrast to a programmer, a TD would normally not work on large programming projects, but rather make heavy use of scripting languages such as Python, MEL, MAXScript, or shell scripting. Another responsibility of a TD is to look after any technical problems the regular artists encounter and to develop custom tools to improve the artists' workflow.

In these industries, "technical artist", "technical animator" and "generalist TD" are sometimes used as synonyms.

Categorization of technical directors in film 
Frequently, the role of a TD is more precisely defined. Various areas of computer graphics require a high degree of specialized technical/scientific knowledge and therefore merit more precise categorization. As an example, a skilled Character TD has a strong understanding of human/animal anatomy, movement, and mechanics, whereas a skilled Lighting TD might have a detailed understanding of the physical properties of light and surfaces.

Those categories include (but are not limited to) the following.
 Effects TD
 Lighting TD
 Modeling TD 
 Pipeline TD
 Layout TD
 Creature TD or Character TD
 Hair TD 
 Cloth TD 
 Matchmove TD

Theatre 
It is a technical director's job to make sure the technical equipment in the theater is functional, maintained and safe. The technical director, along with the production manager, is responsible for the overall organization of the technical production process. Duties included are generating necessary working drawings for construction (in conjunction with a draftsperson, if there is one); budget estimations and maintaining of accounts; materials research and purchasing; scheduling and supervising build crews; coordinating load-ins; handling conflicts that arise between different departments; and organizing the strike and clean-up for the production. Often, the Technical Director can serve as the head of the scenic department, supervising the master carpenter, carpenters, charge artists and leading them in the realization of the scenic designer's vision.

In venues that host touring productions, the TD may also be responsible for advancing the technical rider, hiring local crew, renting equipment and liaising between the tour manager and the local crew.

Television 
The technical director works in a production control room of a television studio and operates the video switcher and associated devices as well as serving as the chief of the television crew.  For a remote broadcast outside the studio, the TD will perform the same duties in a mobile production truck. It is the TD's job to ensure all positions are staffed and all equipment and facilities are checked out and ready before the recording session or live broadcast begins. They typically will switch video sources, perform live digital effects and transitions, and insert pre-recorded material, graphics and titles as instructed by the Television director. In larger productions, the director does not actually operate the production equipment, allowing them to coordinate the production and make rapid decisions without worrying about how to mechanically execute the effect or camera move being called for. The technical director may provide training to more inexperienced members of the technical crew when needed. In consultation with the director, the TD may have more or less input into the creative side of the production, depending on the situation. They may provide the director with guidance on crew assignments, camera shots and the most efficient way to accomplish any given effect. The TD is usually responsible for the technical quality of the signal being recorded or broadcast and will use various measuring devices and displays to ensure quality control.

Technical directors commonly work on productions that are either broadcast live or recorded on video tape or video servers. Television productions shot on film generally do not use TDs, as the camera cuts and effects are realized in post production after the shooting is completed.

The terminology in the UK differs in some respects from the above description: The production control room is called a "gallery", a mobile production truck is called an "OB van" or a "scanner" (a BBC term).  In UK television practice, the technical director is the senior technical person in the gallery and supervises the technical team, but does not operate the "vision mixer".  The TD is responsible for ensuring that the gallery is technically fit for purpose, the routing of internal and external sources, as well as liaison with other technical areas such as master control rooms and transmission suites. They may additionally perform vision control duties, matching the exposure and colour balance of the cameras ("racking").

See also
 Chief Technology Officer

References

External links 
 Stagelink Technical Directors Directory
 Gamasutra article on the role of technical artists (directors) in game production

Entertainment occupations
Management occupations
Directors
Broadcasting occupations
Theatrical occupations
Scenic design
Theatrical management
Television terminology